Eduard Kaempffer (13 May 1859, in Münster – 22 March 1926, in Obernigk) was a German painter, sculptor and medallist.

Life and work 
From 1875 to 1880, he studied with Eduard von Gebhardt and Peter Janssen at the Kunstakademie Düsseldorf.

That same year, he spent some time in Rome; supported by a stipend from the Abraham Wetter Foundation. In 1891, he was back in Munich. In 1893, 1894 und 1895 he was awarded small gold medals at the Große Berliner Kunstausstellung.

Among his most important works are the cycle of paintings in the stairwell at the Erfurt Town hall, which were executed between 1889 and 1896. They depict scenes from the Tannhäuser legend, the saga of Faust, and the life of  Martin Luther; among other subjects. In addition to small bronzes, his sculptures include figures of Salome and Pegasus, as well as a "Lamentation of Christ".

Selected paintings

Sources 
 "Kaempffer, Eduard", In: Allgemeines Lexikon der Bildenden Künstler von der Antike bis zur Gegenwart, Vol. 19: Ingouville–Kauffungen, E. A. Seemann, Leipzig 1926
 "Kaempffer, Eduard". In: Friedrich von Boetticher: Malerwerke des 19. Jahrhunderts. Beitrag zur Kunstgeschichte. Vol.1/2, Heideck–Mayer, Boetticher’s Verlag, Dresden 1895, pg.641 (Online) 
 Petra Hölscher: Die Akademie für Kunst und Kunstgewerbe zu Breslau. Wege einer Kunstschule 1791–1932. Ludwig, Kiel 2003,

External links 

 

1859 births
1926 deaths
19th-century German painters
19th-century German male artists
German history painters
German sculptors
Kunstakademie Düsseldorf alumni
Academy of Fine Arts, Munich alumni
People from Münster
20th-century German painters
20th-century German male artists